There are over 9,000 Grade I listed buildings and 20,000 Grade II* listed buildings in England. This page is a list of these buildings in the unitary authority of Warrington in Cheshire, including the town of Warrington and 18 other civil parishes.

Grade I

|}

Grade II*

Notes

See also

Grade I listed buildings in Cheshire
Grade II* listed buildings in Cheshire
Listed buildings in Warrington (unparished area)

References

Notes

External links

 
 
Lists of Grade I listed buildings in Cheshire
WAr